Karta River Wilderness is a U. S. wilderness area within the Tongass National Forest, centrally located on Prince of Wales Island. The wilderness was established by Congress in 1990, as part of the Tongass Timber Reform Act.

The Karta River flows from the Klawock Mountains down through Salmon and Karta Lakes to the sea. Rich and full of salmon, this artery carries the lifeblood of the Karta Valley. Attracted by its bounty, the Kaigani Haida of Kasaan fished this river and hunted the forest it supports. Later non-natives came, drawn by the same desires to hunt and fish and they built cabins, roads and mines. Today only a few cabins remain on the shores of the lakes and river so that visitors may stay for a short time and continue to seek out the heartbeat of the wilderness.

References

 Wilderness profile

ANILCA establishments
IUCN Category Ib
Protected areas of Prince of Wales–Hyder Census Area, Alaska
Wilderness areas of the Tongass National Forest